Beechwoods is an unincorporated community in Jefferson County, in the U.S. state of Pennsylvania.

History
The Beechwoods Baptist Church was built in the community in 1837.

References

Unincorporated communities in Jefferson County, Pennsylvania
Unincorporated communities in Pennsylvania